Mimosaperdopsis is a monotypic beetle genus in the family Cerambycidae described by Stephan von Breuning in 1959. Its single species, Mimosaperdopsis apiculata, was described by Per Olof Christopher Aurivillius in 1916.

References

Pteropliini
Beetles described in 1916
Monotypic beetle genera